Events from the year 1972 in Denmark.

Incumbents
 Monarch – Frederick IX (until 14 January), Margrethe II
 Prime minister – Jens Otto Krag (until 5 October), Anker Jørgensen

Events

14 January: King Fredrick IX of Denmark dies. He is succeeded by his oldest daughter, Queen Margrethe II.
 17 June: Nordic students leaving Copenhagen following a meeting for Scandinavian students.

Births
30 September – Ari Behn, Norwegian author, playwright, and visual artist (died 2019)
16 October – Trentemøller, composer and musician

Deaths
 9 January – Helga Frier, actress (born 1893)
 14 January – King Frederick IX (born 1899)
 24 May – Asta Nielsen, actress (born 1881)

See also
1972 in Danish television

References

 
Denmark
Years of the 20th century in Denmark
1970s in Denmark